Hawk GT may refer to:
Honda NT650, Honda HawkGT NT650  -- a motorcycle built by Honda 
Studebaker Gran Turismo Hawk, The Studebaker Gran Turismo Hawk (or GT Hawk), a sporty coupe sold between 1962 and 1964